Madoi County (also Matö County or Maduo County) is a county of Golog Tibetan Autonomous Prefecture, in southeast-central Qinghai province, bordering Sichuan to the south. In Madoi County is the upper stream of the Yellow River which flows to Ngoring and Gyaring lake.

Geography and Climate
Average low temperatures are below freezing from early September to mid June; however, due to the wide diurnal temperature variation, average highs are only below freezing from early November thru mid March. Despite frequent rain during summer, when a majority of days sees rain, no month has less than 50% of possible sunshine; with monthly percent possible sunshine ranging from 53% in June to 79% in November, the county seat receives 2,838 hours of bright sunshine annually.

Administrative divisions
Madoi is divided into two towns and two townships:

Huashixia Town
Mazhali Town
Heihe Township
Huanghe Township (黄河乡)
Zhalinghu Township

See also
 List of administrative divisions of Qinghai

References

County-level divisions of Qinghai
Golog Tibetan Autonomous Prefecture